Federico del Bonis was the defending champion, but decided not to participate this year.
Simone Bolelli won the title, defeating Eduardo Schwank 2–6, 6–1, 6–3 in the final.

Seeds

Draw

Finals

Top half

Bottom half

References
 Main Draw
 Qualifying Draw

Roma Open - Singles
2011 Singles